A pride flag is any flag that represents a segment or part of the LGBT community. Pride in this case refers to the notion of gay pride. The terms LGBT flag and queer flag are often used interchangeably.

Pride flags can represent various sexual orientations, romantic orientations, gender identities, subcultures, and regional purposes, as well as the LGBT community as a whole. There are also some pride flags that are not exclusively related to LGBT matters, such as the flag for leather subculture. The rainbow flag, which represents the entire LGBT community, is the most widely used pride flag.

Notable examples

Rainbow

Gilbert Baker designed the rainbow pride flag for the 1978 San Francisco Gay Freedom Day celebration. The flag was designed as a "symbol of hope" and liberation, and an alternative to the symbolism of the pink triangle. The flag does not depict an actual rainbow. Rather, the colors of the rainbow are displayed as horizontal stripes, with red at the top and violet at the bottom. It represents the diversity of gays and lesbians around the world. In the original eight-color version, pink stood for sexuality, red for life, orange for healing, yellow for the sun, green for nature, turquoise for art, indigo for harmony, and violet for spirit. A copy of the original 20-by-30 foot, eight-color flag was made by Baker in 2000 and was installed in the Castro district in San Francisco. Many variations on the rainbow flag exist, including ones incorporating other LGBT symbols like the triangle or lambda.

Aromanticism

The aromantic pride flag consists of five horizontal stripes, which, from top to bottom, are: green, light green, white, gray, and black. The flag was created in 2014 by Cameron Whimsy.
The green and light green represent aromanticism and the aro-spectrum; The white stripe represents friendship/platonic and aesthetic attraction/queerplatonic relationships/family, the importance and validity of all non-romantic relationships and feelings and non-romantic forms of love etc.; the black and grey stripes represent  the sexuality spectrum - acknowledging aro-aces, aromantic allosexuals, and everything in between..

Asexuality 

The asexual pride flag consists of four horizontal stripes: black, gray, white, and purple from top to bottom. The flag was created by an Asexual Visibility and Education Network user standup in August 2010, as part of a community effort to create and choose a flag. The black stripe represents asexuality; the gray stripe represents gray-asexuals and demisexuals; the white stripe represents allies; and the purple stripe represents community.

Bear culture

Bear is an affectionate gay slang term for those in the bear communities, a subculture in the gay community and an emerging subset of the LGBT community with its own events, codes, and a culture-specific identity. Bears tend to have hairy bodies and facial hair; some are heavy-set; some project an image of working-class masculinity in their grooming and appearance, though none of these are requirements or unique indicators. The bear concept can function as an identity, an affiliation, and an ideal to live up to. There is ongoing debate in bear communities about what constitutes a bear. Some state that self-identifying as a bear is the only requirement, while others argue that bears must have certain physical characteristics, such as a hairy chest and face, a large body, or a certain mode of dress and behavior.

Bears are almost always gay or bisexual men; transgender men attracted to other men are increasingly included within bear communities. The bear community has spread all over the world, with bear clubs in many countries. Bear clubs often serve as social and sexual networks for older, hairier, sometimes heavier gay and bisexual men, and members often contribute to their local gay communities through fundraising and other functions. Bear events are common in heavily gay communities.

The International Bear Brotherhood Flag was designed in 1995 by Craig Byrnes.

Bisexuality

Introduced on December 5, 1998, the bisexual pride flag was designed by activist Michael Page to represent and increase the visibility of bisexual people in the LGBT community and society as a whole. Page chose a combination of Pantone Matching System (PMS) colors magenta (pink), lavender (purple), and royal (blue). The finished rectangular flag consists of a broad pink stripe at the top, a broad stripe in blue at the bottom, and a narrow purple stripe in the center.

Page described the meaning of the colors as, "The pink color represents sexual attraction to the same sex only (gay and lesbian), the blue represents sexual attraction to the opposite sex only (straight) and the resultant overlap color purple represents sexual attraction to both sexes (bi)." He also described the flag's meaning in deeper terms, stating "The key to understanding the symbolism in the Bi Pride Flag is to know that the purple pixels of color blend unnoticeably into both the pink and blue, just as in the 'real world' where bi people blend unnoticeably into both the gay/lesbian and straight communities."

The blue and pink overlapping triangle symbol represents bisexuality and bisexual pride. The origin of the symbol, sometimes facetiously referred to as the "biangles", is largely unknown; however, some postulations describe the colors as "pink represents attraction to women and the blue attraction to men, or the pink represents homosexuality, the blue heterosexuality and the purple bisexuality."

Intersex

The intersex flag was created by Morgan Carpenter of Intersex Human Rights Australia in July 2013 to create a flag "that is not derivative, but is yet firmly grounded in meaning". The organization describes the circle as "unbroken and unornamented, symbolising wholeness and completeness, and our potentialities. We are still fighting for bodily autonomy and genital integrity, and this symbolises the right to be who and how we want to be".

Lesbian

No single flag design for a lesbian pride flag has been widely adopted. However, many popular ones exist.

The labrys lesbian flag was created in 1999 by graphic designer Sean Campbell, and published in June 2000 in the Palm Springs edition of the Gay and Lesbian Times Pride issue. The design involves a labrys, a type of double-headed axe, superimposed on the inverted black triangle, set against a violet background. Among its functions, the labrys was associated as a weapon used by the Amazons of mythology. In the 1970s it was adopted as a symbol of empowerment by the lesbian feminist community. Women considered asocial by Nazi Germany for not conforming to the Nazi ideal of a woman, which included homosexual females, were condemned to concentration camps and wore an inverted black triangle badge to identify them. Some lesbians reclaimed this symbol as gay men reclaimed the pink triangle (many lesbians also reclaimed the pink triangle although lesbians were not included in Paragraph 175 of the German criminal code). The color violet became associated with lesbians via the poetry of Sappho.

The lipstick lesbian flag was introduced by Natalie McCray in 2010 in the weblog This Lesbian Life. The design contains a red kiss in the left corner, superimposed on seven stripes consisting of six shades of red and pink colors and a white bar in the center. The lipstick lesbian flag represents "homosexual women who have a more feminine gender expression", but has not been widely adopted. Some lesbians are against it because it does not include butch lesbians, while others have accused McCray of writing biphobic, racist, and transphobic comments on her blog.

The "pink" lesbian flag was derived from the lipstick lesbian flag but with the kiss mark removed. The pink flag attracted more use as a general lesbian pride flag.

The "orange-pink" lesbian flag, modeled after the seven-band pink flag, was introduced on Tumblr by blogger Emily Gwen in 2018. The colors include dark orange for "gender non-conformity", orange for "independence", light orange for "community", white for "unique relationships to womanhood", pink for "serenity and peace", dusty pink for "love and sex", and dark rose for "femininity". A five-stripes version was soon derived from the 2018 colors.

Gallery of lesbian pride flags

Non-binary

The non-binary pride flag was created in 2014 by activist Kye Rowan. Each stripe color represents different types of non-binary identities: Yellow for people who identify outside of the gender binary, white for nonbinary people with multiple genders, purple for those with a mixture of both male and female genders, and black for agender individuals.

Under the non-binary umbrella are all those people who identify off the gender binary. There are many different identities within this category including androgyny, genderqueerness (which includes agender, ceterosexual, genderfluid, intergender, among others), third gender, and transgender.

Pansexuality

The pansexual pride flag was introduced in October 2010 in a Tumblr blog ("Pansexual Pride Flag"). It has three horizontal bars that are pink, yellow and blue. "The pink represents being attracted to women, the blue being attracted to men, and the yellow for being attracted to everyone else"; such as non-binary gender identities.

Transgender

The transgender pride flag was designed by transgender woman Monica Helms in 1999. It was first shown at a pride parade in Phoenix, Arizona, US, in 2000. It was flown from a large public flagpole in San Francisco's Castro District beginning November 19, 2012, in commemoration of the Transgender Day of Remembrance. The flag represents the transgender community and consists of five horizontal stripes: two light blue, two pink, with a white stripe in the center. Helms described the meaning of the flag as follows:

Philadelphia became the first county government in the United States to raise the transgender pride flag in 2015. It was raised at City Hall in honor of Philadelphia's 14th Annual Trans Health Conference, and remained next to the US and City of Philadelphia flags for the entirety of the conference. Then-Mayor Michael Nutter gave a speech in honor of the trans community's acceptance in Philadelphia.

Gallery

Location-based flags

References